Nutha (sometimes Gut Nutha) is a village and a former municipality in the district of Anhalt-Bitterfeld, in Saxony-Anhalt, Germany. Since 1 January 2010, it is part of the town Zerbst.

It was the birthplace (1909) of the writer and anti-Nazi resistance fighter Werner Keller. 

Former municipalities in Saxony-Anhalt
Zerbst